El Tule is a town, and one of the 67 municipalities of Chihuahua, in northern Mexico. The municipal seat is the town of El Tule. The municipality covers an area of 409.4 km2. The municipal seat is El Tule, Chihuahua.

As of 2010, the municipality had a total population of 1,869, up from 1,818 as of 2005.

The municipality had 35 localities, none of which had a population over 1,000.

Geography

Towns and villages
The municipality has 31 localities.

References

Municipalities of Chihuahua (state)